The 1868 Maine gubernatorial election was held on September 14, 1868. Incumbent Republican Governor and war hero Joshua Chamberlain defeated the Democratic candidate Eben F. Pillsbury.

General election

Candidates

Republican 

 Joshua Chamberlain

Democratic 

 Eben F. Pillsbury

Results 
Chamberlain won reelection to a third term, and won a majority of 19,316 votes.

References 

Maine gubernatorial elections
Maine
1868 Maine elections